Profesor Wilczur is a 1938 Polish romantic drama film directed by Michał Waszyński, a sequel to Znachor (1937). It is based on the novel by Tadeusz Dołęga-Mostowicz.

Cast
Kazimierz Junosza-Stępowski ...  Prof. Rafal Wilczur 
Jacek Woszczerowicz ...  Jemiol 
Elżbieta Barszczewska ...  Marysia Wilczurówna / Czynska 
Witold Zacharewicz ...  Leszek Czynski 
Dobieslaw Damiecki ...  Juliusz Dembicz 
Józef Węgrzyn ...  Dr. Stefan Dobraniecki 
Pelagia Relewicz-Ziembinska ...  Lila Dobraniecka 
Mieczysława Ćwiklińska ...  Florentyna Szkopkowa 
Marysia R. ...  Elza Czynska (as Three-Year-Old Marysia R.) 
Henryk Modrzewski ...  Dembicz's Manager 
Wlodzimierz Lozinski ...  Wasyl Prokop 
Wanda Jakubinska ...  Sick Boy's Mother 
Tekla Trapszo ...  Dr. Zygmunt's Mother 
Mieczyslaw Winkler ...  Wilczur's Servant Ludwik 
Paweł Owerłło ...  Minister Dolant

External links 
 

1938 films
1930s Polish-language films
Polish black-and-white films
Films directed by Michał Waszyński
1938 romantic drama films
Films based on Polish novels
Films based on works by Tadeusz Dołęga-Mostowicz
Polish romantic drama films